This is a list of the National Register of Historic Places listings in Brazos County, Texas.

This is intended to be a complete list of properties and districts listed on the National Register of Historic Places in Brazos County, Texas. There are two districts and 43 individual properties listed on the National Register in the county along with one formerly listed property. Five individually listed properties are Recorded Texas Historic Landmarks including one that is also a State Antiquities Landmark. One district contains several more Recorded Texas Historic Landmarks.

Current listings

The locations of National Register properties and districts may be seen in a mapping service provided.

|}

Former listings

|}

See also

National Register of Historic Places listings in Texas
Recorded Texas Historic Landmarks in Brazos County

References

External links

Registered Historic Places
Brazos County
Buildings and structures in Brazos County, Texas